Henry Hobhouse  (1 March 1854 – 25 June 1937) was an English landowner and Liberal, and from 1886 Liberal Unionist politician who sat in the House of Commons from 1885 to 1906.

Hobhouse was the son of Henry Hobhouse, of Hadspen House, Somerset, and his wife, the Hon. Charlotte Etruria Talbot, daughter of James Talbot, 3rd Baron Talbot of Malahide. He had several siblings, including Emily Hobhouse. After his father's death in 1862 his uncle Arthur Hobhouse became his guardian. He was educated at Eton and Balliol College, Oxford, and was called to the Bar at Lincoln's Inn. He practised as a parliamentary draughtsman and was a J.P. for Somerset.
 
In the 1885 general election, Hobhouse was elected MP for East Somerset. He held the seat until 1906. Hobhouse was particularly concerned with education. He was appointed to the Board of Education in 1900 and was behind the establishment of the 1902 Education Act.

Hobhouse was involved in the founding of Sexey's School and Sunny Hill (now Bruton School for Girls) at Bruton. He was also pro-chancellor of Bristol University and an honorary LLD of the University,. He worked hard on behalf of the university and left a collection of books to the library.

Hobhouse was a county figure and knowledgeable about local matters. A member of Somerset County Council, he was responsible for forming the County Councils Association. He was also behind the establishment of the Cider Institute in 1902 and was its chairman.

Marriage
He married Margaret Heyworth Potter (daughter of Richard Potter).  Their children included: Stephen Henry Hobhouse, an important British peace activist and prison reformer; Arthur Lawrence Hobhouse built the system of National parks in England and Wales, and John Richard, a ship owner who was the father of the law lord John Hobhouse, Baron Hobhouse of Woodborough; and Rachel (1883–1981) married Sir George Felix Neville Clay, 5th Baronet, and had a son Sir Henry Felix Clay, 6th Baronet. Their youngest son died in the First World War, and another daughter died in infancy. Margaret died in 1921, and, in 1923, Hobhouse married Anne Mackessack.

Death
Hobhouse lived at Hadspen House, Castle Cary, Somerset, and died at the age of 83.

References

External links 
 

1854 births
1937 deaths
Liberal Party (UK) MPs for English constituencies
Members of Somerset County Council
UK MPs 1885–1886
UK MPs 1886–1892
UK MPs 1892–1895
UK MPs 1895–1900
UK MPs 1900–1906
People educated at Eton College
Alumni of Balliol College, Oxford
People associated with the University of Bristol
People from South Somerset (district)
20th-century English landowners
Henry
Potter family
Members of the Privy Council of the United Kingdom
Liberal Unionist Party MPs for English constituencies